The Iron Bridge or Semigallia Bridge (Zemgales tilts) was a bridge that crossed the Daugava river in Riga, the capital of Latvia. It was built in 1871–72. The bridge was bombarded twice, during World War I and World War II, and was not rebuilt after the last war. The only remains of the bridge are its pillars in the river.

References 

Bridges in Latvia
Bridges completed in 1872